Chlorangiellaceae is a green algae family in the order Chlamydomonadales.

References

External links
 
 
 

Chlorophyceae families
Chlamydomonadales